Antonino Faranda (born in Capo d'Orlando, 2 April 1968) is an Italian entrepreneur and founder of Gruppo TUO, an industrial group providing wholesale distribution of groceries and related products in the large-scale food distribution. He is also President of Doreca group and of Bioenergie group.

Honours

National Honours 
: Cavaliere del Lavoro of the Order of Merit for Labour (May 29, 2009)

References 

Businesspeople from Sicily
Italian company founders
1968 births
People from the Province of Messina
Living people